Saurian Exorcisms is the second solo album by Karl Sanders, the vocalist/guitarist of the death metal band Nile. It was released on 14 April 2009 through The End Records. The music is a full length exploration of the atmospheric interludes heard on Nile's previous albums, and still draws on ancient Iraqi themes for inspiration. Sanders also drew inspiration from other types of music such as Tibetan, Indian and Arabic.

Track listing
All songs written and composed by Karl Sanders.

 "Preliminary Purification Before the Calling of Inanna" – 3:51
 "Rapture of the Empty Spaces" – 4:23
 "Contemplate This on the Tree of Woe" – 3:53
 "A Most Effective Exorcism Against Azathoth and His Emissaries" – 5:29
 "Slavery Unto Nitokris" – 5:54
 "Shira Gula Pazu" – 4:59
 "Kali Ma" – 3:38
 "Curse the Sun" – 4:52
 "Impalement and Cruxifiction of the Last Remnants of the Pre-Human Serpent Volk" – 4:10
 "Dying Embers of the Aga Mass SSSratu" – 6:10

Personnel
 Karl Sanders - baglama saz, glissentar, acoustic guitars, guitar synthesizer, keyboards, drums, percussion, vocals
 Mike Brezeale - vocals and chants

Production
Produced by Bob Moore & Juan "Punchy" Gonzalez
Mixed by "Bob Moore & His Orchestra"

References

External links 
 Debut press release 
 Karl Sanders at MySpace

2009 albums
Karl Sanders albums
The End Records albums